Aleksander Naeres (also Aleksander Naeris; 19 July 1885 Martna Parish, Lääne County – 29 June 1942 Tavda, Sverdlovsk Oblast) was an Estonian politician. He was a member of VI Riigikogu (its National Council).

References

1885 births
1942 deaths
Members of the Estonian National Assembly
Members of the Riiginõukogu
People who died in the Gulag
Estonian people who died in Soviet detention
People from Lääne-Nigula Parish